Tadesse Haile (born 9 December 1952) is an Ethiopian boxer. He competed in the men's lightweight event at the 1980 Summer Olympics.

References

1952 births
Living people
Ethiopian male boxers
Olympic boxers of Ethiopia
Boxers at the 1980 Summer Olympics
Place of birth missing (living people)
Lightweight boxers